Laksegade is a street in central Copenhagen, Denmark. It runs from Kongens Nytorv in the northeast to Admiralgade in the southwest from where it continues as Boldhusgade to Ved Stranden.

History

A shallow-watered area known as Dybet was in the Middle Ages located where Laksegade runs today. The water separated Zealand from the small isle of Bremerholm where the Royal Dockyard was then located. Dybet was reclaimed and initially the site of the royal vegetable garden.

The royal vegetable garden was moved to Kongens Have when the area was built over with terraced housing for naval officers and personnel of Bremerholm in circa 1620. The houses were initially known as Skipperhusene but became known as Gammelboder (Old Houses) when Nyboder (New Houses) was constructed a few decades later. The streets in the area had a grid-like layout and were named after fish species and other sea creatures: Laksegade, Ulkegade, Størestræde, Delfingade and Hummergade. The neighborhood was completely destroyed in the Copenhagen Fire of 1795.

The name Laksegade only referred to the southwestern section of the street from Admiralgade to Bremerholm (Ulkegade). The eastern part of the street (No. 1-11 and No. 2-10) was until 1877 known as Reverensgade (Bow Street). The name was most likely a reference to its "bending" shape.

Notable buildings and residents

A number of buildings along the street date from the years immediately after the Great Fire of 1795, including No. 26 and No. 30 which have both been listed in the Danish registry of protected buildings and places.

The first part of the street passes the Erichsen Mansion whose principal facade faces Kongens Nytorv. The adjacent facade is the rear side of the three-winged office building at Holmens Kanal 4. It was built for Kjøbenhavns Handelsbank to design by Frederik Levy in 1908–1910. Laksegade 7, the rear side of Holmens Kanal 1, is from 1830.

The building with the rounded corner at Laksegade 4/Vingårdstræde 3 is from 1927 to 1928 and was designed by Carl Brummer. A skyway connects it to a numberless, gabled building on the other side of the street.

Transport
The Kongens Nytorv metro station is located at the eastern end of the street. It is served by M1, M2 and M3.

References

External links

 Laksegade at indenforvoldene.dk

Streets in Copenhagen